Man-Machine or Man and Machine may refer to:

Technology 

 Human–computer interaction, man-machine interaction (MMI)
 MML (programming language), a man-machine language
 Cyborg, a cybernetic organism which enhances its abilities by using technology
 Transhumanism, the idea of human enhancement via technology

Music 

 The Man-Machine, a 1978 album by Kraftwerk
 Man vs. Machine, a 2002 album by rapper Xzibit
 Man and Machine (album), a 2002 album by U.D.O.
 Man Machine, an early '90s techno/electro project, signed to Rhythm King

Other 

 Machine Man, a 1977 character created by Jack Kirby for Marvel Comics
 Mann & Machine, a 1992 American science fiction police drama television series
 Ghost in the Shell 2: Man-Machine Interface, a 1997 manga by Masamune Shirow
 Man a Machine, a 1748 work of materialist philosophy by French physician and philosopher Julien Offray de La Mettrie
 Maschinenmensch ("machine-human"), a robot featured in the film Metropolis

See also 
 Man engine, a ladder-like mechanism installed in mines